Little Bear Mountain is a basaltic Pleistocene age tuya in the Boundary Ranges of the Coast Mountains that adjoins Hoodoo Mountain to the north. Little Bear Mountain is part of the Northern Cordilleran Volcanic Province.

See also
 List of volcanoes in Canada
 List of Northern Cordilleran volcanoes
 Volcanism of Canada
 Volcanism of Western Canada

References
 Catalogue of Canadian volcanoes: Little Bear Mountain

External links
 Global Volcanism Program: Hoodoo Mountain

Volcanoes of British Columbia
One-thousanders of British Columbia
Boundary Ranges
Tuyas of Canada
Parasitic cones
Stikine Country
Pleistocene volcanoes